Atlin may either be:

Atlin Lake, one of British Columbia's largest lakes
Atlin, British Columbia, a town in the far northwest of British Columbia, named for the lake, centre of a Klondike-era gold rush
Atlin Road, road in Yukon and British Columbia
Atlin District, the name for the region including Atlin, and also of a formal mining district of nearly the same territory
Atlin (electoral district), a defunct provincial electoral district in British Columbia
Atlin Provincial Park and Recreation Area, a provincial park in British Columbia
Comox—Atlin, a defunct federal electoral district in British Columbia
Atlin Volcanic Field, a geological area

See also
 Atlin Mountain
 Mount Atlin